The Jindal Journal of Business Research is a peer-reviewed journal that aims to address the fundamental problems of business management in a multidisciplinary framework. It provides a platform for advancing the understanding of management in a global context.

The Journal is published by SAGE Publications, India in Association with O. P. Jindal Global University (JGU).

The journal is a member of the Committee on Publication Ethics (COPE).

Abstracting and indexing 
Jindal Journal of Business Research is abstracted and indexed in:
 J-Gate

External links 
 
 Homepage

References 

 COPE

SAGE Publishing academic journals
Publications established in 2012
Business and management journals
English-language journals
Biannual journals